American rock band Awolnation has released four studio albums, three extended plays, eighteen singles and fifteen music videos. The band is signed to Better Noise Music since the release of their fourth EP, previously being signed to Red Bull Records, and their first EP, Back from Earth, was released on iTunes on May 18, 2010. They released their first studio album, Megalithic Symphony, on March 15, 2011; it featured their biggest hit single, "Sail", which peaked at number 17 on the Billboard Hot 100, number four on the Billboard Rock Songs chart, and number five on the Billboard Alternative Songs chart. The song has been certified 6× platinum by the RIAA and has sold 5,500,000 copies in the United States. As of February 29, 2016, the album has been certified platinum. The band's second studio album, Run, was released on March 17, 2015.

Studio albums

Extended plays

Cover albums

Singles

As lead artist

As featured artist

Promotional singles

Music videos

Notes

References

External links
 

Discographies of American artists
Alternative rock discographies